Utetheisa leucospilota is a moth in the family Erebidae. It was described by Frederic Moore in 1877. It is found on the Andaman Islands.

References

Moths described in 1877
leucospilota